Daniel Raymond Mills (born 13 February 1975) is an English former professional footballer who played in the Football League as a midfielder.

References

1975 births
Living people
English footballers
Association football midfielders
Footballers from Sidcup
Charlton Athletic F.C. players
Barnet F.C. players
Brighton & Hove Albion F.C. players
English Football League players